The Men's Marathon race at the 2005 World Championships in Athletics was held on August 13 in the streets of Helsinki with the goal line situated in the Helsinki Olympic Stadium.

Eventual winner Jaouad Gharib attacked just before 30 km mark, getting Italian Olympic champion Stefano Baldini with him. Baldini had cramps few kilometres later and he retired after 35 kilometres.

Medalists

Abbreviations
All times shown are in hours:minutes:seconds

Records

Intermediates

Finishing times 
  Jaouad Gharib, Morocco 2:10:10
  Christopher Isengwe, Tanzania 2:10:21 (PB)
  Tsuyoshi Ogata, Japan 2:11:16 (SB)
  Toshinari Takaoka, Japan 2:11:53
  Samson Ramadhani, Tanzania 2:12:08 (SB)
  Alex Malinga, Uganda 2:12:12 (NR)
  Paul Biwott, Kenya 2:12:39
  Julio Rey, Spain 2:12:51
  Brian Sell, United States 2:13:27 (SB)
  Marilson Gomes dos Santos, Brazil 2:13:40 (SB)
  Robert Cheboror, Kenya 2:14:08 (SB)
  Dan Robinson, Great Britain 2:14:26 (SB)
  Gudisa Shentama, Ethiopia 2:15:13
  Wataru Okutani, Japan 2:15:30
  Luc Krotwaar, Netherlands 2:15:47 (SB)
  Rafał Wójcik, Poland 2:16:24
  Ottaviano Andriani, Italy 2:16:29
  Luís Jesus, Portugal 2:16:33 (SB)
  Ambesse Tolosa, Ethiopia 2:16:36
  Satoshi Irifune, Japan 2:17:22
  Haile Satayin, Israel 2:17:26 (SB)
  Clinton Verran, United States 2:17:42 (SB)
  Abdelkebir Lamachi, Morocco 2:17:53
  Luís Novo, Portugal 2:18:36 (SB)
  Yared Asmerom, Eritrea 2:18:46 (SB)
  Antoni Bernadó, Andorra 2:19:06
  Scott Westcott, Australia 2:19:18
  Scott Winton, New Zealand 2:19:41
  Joseph Riri, Kenya 2:19:51
  José Manuel Martínez, Spain 2:20:07
  Hailu Negussie, Ethiopia 2:20:25
  Ri Kyong-Chol, North Korea 2:20:35
  André Luiz Ramos, Brazil 2:21:06
  Juan Vargas, Mexico 2:21:29
  Ruggero Pertile, Italy 2:21:34
  Abdelhakim Bagy, France 2:21:49 (SB)
  Wodage Zvadya, Israel 2:21:57 (SB)
  Nelson Cruz, Cape Verde 2:22:12 (NR)
  Francis Kirwa, Finland 2:22:22
  Jason Lehmkuhle, United States 2:22:46 (SB)
  Claudir Rodrigues, Brazil 2:23:11 (SB)
  Pamenos Ballantyne, Saint Vincent and the Grenadines 2:23:18 (SB)
  Jonathan Wyatt, New Zealand 2:23:19
  Huw Lobb, Great Britain 2:23:38
  Alberto Chaíça, Portugal 2:23:42 (SB)
  Grigoriy Andreyev, Russia 2:23:50
  Asaf Bimro, Israel 2:23:58
  Michitaka Hosokawa, Japan 2:24:38
  Clodoaldo da Silva, Brazil 2:25:02
  Kamal Ziani, Spain 2:25:06
  Peter Gilmore, United States 2:25:17
  Alfredo Arévalo, Guatemala 2:25:37 (SB)
  Yrjö Pesonen, Finland 2:25:39
  Je In-Mo, South Korea 2:26:39
  Ismaïl Sghyr, France 2:27:07
  Oleg Bolkhovets, Russia 2:27:08
  Cristian Villavicencio, Nicaragua 2:27:50
  Jeroen van Damme, Netherlands 2:29:22
  Chad Johnson, United States 2:30:45
  Cho Keun-Hyung, South Korea 2:31:59
  Bat-Ochiryn Ser-Od, Mongolia 2:36:31

Athletes who did not finish 
  Ahmed Jumaa Jaber, Qatar
  António Sousa, Portugal
  Aman Majid Awadh, Qatar
  Saïd Belhout, Algeria
  David Ramard, France
  Wilson Onsare, Kenya
  José Ríos, Spain
  Stefano Baldini, Italy
  Vanderlei de Lima, Brazil
  Anuradha Cooray, Sri Lanka
  Collin Khoza, South Africa
  Khalid El Boumlili, Morocco
  Al Mustafa Riyadh, Bahrain
  Getuli Bayo, Tanzania
  Abderrahime Bouramdane, Morocco
  Dmitriy Burmakin, Russia
  Gashaw Melese, Ethiopia
  Tsotang Simon Maine, Lesotho
  Tuomo Lehtinen, Finland
  Migidio Bourifa, Italy
  Jimmy Muindi, Kenya
  Alberico di Cecco, Italy
  Kim Yi-Yong, South Korea
  Janne Holmén, Finland
  José Amado García, Guatemala
  Shadrack Hoff, South Africa
  Gert Thys, South Africa
  Zepherinus Joseph, Saint Lucia
  Hendrick Ramaala, South Africa
  Makhosonke Fika, South Africa
  Ahmed Ezzobayry, France
  Jean-Paul Gahimbaré, Burundi
  Zebedayo Bayo, Tanzania

Athletes who did not start 
  David Sumukwo, Uganda

See also
 Men's Olympic Marathon (2004)
 2005 World Marathon Cup

External links
IAAF results

Marathon
Marathons at the World Athletics Championships
2005 marathons
Men's marathons